Atomic Mom is a 2010 documentary film written and directed by M.T. Silvia about the complex experiences of two women struggling with the emotional repercussions of their connections to the nuclear bombings on Hiroshima, Japan, at the end of World War II in August 1945.

Synopsis

Atomic Mom is a documentary film written and directed by M.T Silvia, which focuses on the connection between two mothers that are each on a different end of the Hiroshima atomic warfare spectrum: Pauline Silvia, a United States Navy biologist, and one of the only women scientists present during the 1953 radiation detonations of Operation Upshot–Knothole at the then-Nevada Test Site, and Emiko Okada, a Japanese woman who was exposed to radiation from the Hiroshima nuclear bombings as a child. Atomic Mom also offers a comparison of the Hiroshima Peace Memorial Museum and the Atomic Testing Museum in Las Vegas, Nevada. Through the use of numerous interviews with Japanese doctors, historians and Hiroshima survivors, M.T Silvia discusses matters of censorship, value of scientific innovation, human rights, personal responsibility and the prospect of world peace in the aftermath of Hiroshima.

Interviews

 Pauline Silvia 
 Emiko Okada 
 Mary Palevsky
 Andy Kirk
 Ray Harbert
 Shuntaro Hida
 Dr. Helen Caldicott

Production
Despite accruing multiple professional filmography credits for her studio management work on various Pixar films, Atomic Mom was the first internationally recognized film that M.T Silvia produced and directed as an independent film maker.

Funding for the film was procured from dozens of individual donors as well as Nevada Humanities, Rhode Island Council for the Humanities, The Pacific Pioneer Fund, and Google Matching Funds.

Reception

Robert Jacobs of The Asia-Pacific Journal called Atomic Mom “ambitious” and “complex”, and praised Silvia for making a “film that is both historically compelling and deeply personal, a rare achievement.”

Awards

 2011: Audience Award for Best Feature Documentary at the Sacramento Film and Music Festival 
 2011: Jury Award for Best Feature Documentary at the Thin Line Film Festival  
 2011: Silver Palm Award for Feature Documentary at the Mexico City International Film Festival
 2011: Gold Medal for Excellence in Music : Marco d'Ambrosio & Klaudia Promessi at the Park City Film Music Festival

Festivals/Screenings

United States

 Mill Valley Film Festival (California)   
 Sacramento Film and Music Festival  
 Thin Line Film Festival (Texas)   
 Los Angeles Women's International Film Festival  
 Women's International Film & Arts Festival (Florida)   
 Sarasota Film Festival  
 Riverside International Film Festival (California)   
 Park City Film Music Festival (Utah)    
 New Jersey International Film Festival   
 Rhode Island International Film Festival  
 The White Sands International Film Festival (New Mexico)   
 Southern Utah International Documentary Film Festival  
 Big Bear Lake International Film Festival  
 Global Peace Film Festival (Florida)   
 Citizen Jane Film Festival (Missouri)   
 Kansas City International Film Festival  
LA Femme Film Festival
 14th United Nations Association Film Festival  
 Red Rock Film Festival (Utah)   
   
International

 Mexico City International Film Festival  
 Hiroshima Peace Film Festival (Japan)   
 Off Plus Camera International Festival of Independent Cinema (Poland)  
 Addis International Film Festival (Ethiopia)   
 International Uranium Film Festival (Brazil)

Other Screenings   
  
Women's International League for Peace and Freedom – Screening Preview   
 San Francisco International Women's Film Festival - Screening and Panel Discussion  
 UCLA – Screening and Panel Discussion   
 Women's Action for New Directions, Mothers' Day Peace Event (Michigan)   
 International Campaign Against Nuclear Weapons, Australian Centre for the Moving Image Melbourne, Australia

References

External links
 
 

2010 films
Documentary films about the atomic bombings of Hiroshima and Nagasaki
2010 documentary films
Documentary films about women
American documentary films
2010s American films